Balghelu Rural District is in the Central District of Ardabil County, Ardabil province, Iran. At the census of 2006, its population was 21,368 in 4,966 households; there were 7,297 inhabitants in 1,987 households at the following census of 2011; and in the most recent census of 2016, it had increased to 8,054 in 2,334 households. The largest of its 18 villages was Sham Asbi, with 2,817 people.

References 

Ardabil County

Rural Districts of Ardabil Province

Populated places in Ardabil Province

Populated places in Ardabil County